The year 1532 in science and technology included a number of events, some of which are listed here.

Astronomy
 Petrus Apianus publishes at Ingolstadt  (on his observations of comets) and Quadrans astronomicus Apiani (on the astronomical quadrant).

Botany
 Otto Brunfels publishes a book of herbs.
 Sugar cane first cultivated in Brazil.
 Gherardo Cibo begins his herbarium, the oldest still surviving.

Geography
 Jacob Ziegler publishes his principal geographical treatise, Quae intus continentur Syria, Palestina, Arabia, Aegyptus, Schondia, Holmiae... at Strasbourg.

Births
 John Hawkins, English navigator (died 1595)
 Pedro Sarmiento de Gamboa, Spanish explorer and scientist (died 1592)

Deaths
 Diego de Ordaz, Spanish explorer (born 1480)

References

 
16th century in science
1530s in science